Alpena Power Company is a public utility company that provides electricity to most of Alpena County, Michigan, as well as southeastern Presque Isle County and the village of Hillman, in Montmorency County. The headquarters are located in Alpena, Michigan. The company was founded in 1881 by George N. Fletcher.  
they produce 1-2% of power for the area using 3 hydro electric dams located on the thunder bay river.

Alpena Power has one 138KV interconnection with Consumers Energy/METC.

See also
 Lists of public utilities

External links
 

Alpena County, Michigan
Companies based in Michigan
Electric power companies of the United States
1881 establishments in Michigan